Varderyggfonna is a glacier in Wedel Jarlsberg Land at Spitsbergen, Svalbard. The glacier has a length of about 3.5 kilometers, is part of the Recherchebreen glacier complex, and is located between Konglomeratfjellet, Haugknatten and Varderyggen.

See also
List of glaciers in Svalbard

References

Glaciers of Spitsbergen